Horaglanis abdulkalami is a species of airbreathing catfish endemic to India.

Description and naming 
It was described by Subhash Babu Kallikadavil of the Cochin University of Science and Technology in 2012. It was named after former President of India Abdul Kalam.

References

Horaglanis
Catfish of Asia
Cave fish
Freshwater fish of India
Fish described in 2012